Vellinge is a locality and the seat of Vellinge Municipality, Skåne County, Sweden with 6,829 inhabitants in 2019.

It was ranked the second "best place to live" in Sweden - and the best in the south of Sweden - in Fokus magazine's 2009 survey.

References 

Populated places in Vellinge Municipality
Populated places in Skåne County
Populated places in the Øresund Region
Municipal seats of Skåne County
Swedish municipal seats